Movement of Free Citizens may refer to:
Movement of Free Citizens (Greece), former political party in Greece.
Movement of Free Citizens (Serbia), political movement in Serbia.